Bencyclane is an antispasmodic, vasodilator, and platelet aggregation inhibitor.

Synthesis

Grignard addition of benzylmagnesiumbromide to suberone would give 1-benzylcycloheptanol [4006-73-9] (1'). Williamson ether synthesis with 3-dimethylaminopropylchloride [109-54-6] (2) completed the synthesis of bencyclane (3).

See also
Clofenciclan

References

Calcium channel blockers
Ethers
Dimethylamino compounds